In crystallography, materials science and metallurgy, Vegard's law is an empirical finding (heuristic approach) resembling the rule of mixtures. In 1921, Lars Vegard discovered that the lattice parameter of a solid solution of two constituents is approximately a weighted mean of the two constituents' lattice parameters at the same temperature:

e.g., in the case of a mixed oxide of uranium and plutonium as used in the fabrication of MOX nuclear fuel:

Vegard's law assumes that both components A and B in their pure form (i.e. before mixing) have the same crystal structure.

Vegard's law is seldom perfectly obeyed; often deviations from the linear behavior are observed. A detailed study of such deviations was conducted by King. However, it is often used in practice to obtain rough estimates when experimental data are not available for the lattice parameter for the system of interest. 

For systems known to approximately obey Vegard's law, the approximation may also be used to estimate the composition of a solution from knowledge of its lattice parameters, which are easily obtained from diffraction data. For example, consider the semiconductor compound . A relation exists between the constituent elements and their associated lattice parameters, such that:

When variations in lattice parameter are very small across the entire composition range, Vegard's law becomes equivalent to Amagat's law.

Relationship to band gaps in semiconductors
In many binary semiconducting systems, the band gap in semiconductors is approximately a linear function of the lattice parameter. Therefore, if the lattice parameter of a semiconducting system follows Vegard's law, one can also write a linear relationship between the band gap and composition. Using  as before, the band gap energy,  can be written as:

Sometimes, the linear interpolation between the band gap energies is not accurate enough, and a second term to account for the curvature of the band gap energies as a function of composition is added. This curvature correction is characterized by the bowing parameter, :

Mineralogy
The following excerpt from Takashi Fujii (1960) summarises well the limits of the Vegard’s law in the context of mineralogy and also makes the link with the Gladstone–Dale equation:

See also
When considering the empirical correlation of some physical properties and the chemical composition of solid compounds, other relationships, rules, or laws, also closely resembles the Vegard's law, and in fact the more general rule of mixtures: 
 Amagat's law
 Gladstone–Dale equation
 Kopp's law
 Kopp–Neumann law
 Rule of mixtures

References

Crystallography
Materials science
Metallurgy
Mineralogy
Eponyms